The President of the Catholic Bishops' Conference of the Philippines (Filipino: Pangulo ng Kapulungan ng mga Katolikong Obispo sa Pilipinas) is the executive head of the Catholic Bishops' Conference of the Philippines.

Like all CBCP officials, the length of the term of the CBCP is two years and can run for a maximum of two terms.

By tradition, the CBCP usually elects the Vice President as the next president.

The President along with the CBCP Permanent Council comes of with a collective decision for the CBCP.

Pablo Virgilio David, Bishop of Kalookan, is the CBCP President since December 1, 2021.

The following is a list of people who held the post.

List 
Source for Presidents; 1945–2014: CBCP

References

 
Religious leadership roles
Catholic Bishops' Conference of the Philippines